Pârâul Întunecat may refer to:

 Pârâul Întunecat, a tributary of the Turia in Covasna County
 Pârâul Întunecat, a tributary of the Mărcușa in Covasna County
 Valea Întunecoasă, a tributary of the Ozunca in Covasna County